The 2022–2023 mpox outbreak in Canada is a part of the outbreak of human mpox caused by the West African clade of the monkeypox virus. The outbreak started in Canada on May 19, 2022, with the country since then becoming one of the most affected in the Americas.

Background 

An ongoing outbreak of mpox was confirmed on May 6, 2022, beginning with a British resident who, after travelling to Nigeria (where the disease is endemic), presented symptoms consistent with mpox on 29 April 2022. The resident returned to the United Kingdom on 4 May, creating the country's index case of the outbreak. The origin of several of the cases of mpox in the United Kingdom is unknown. Some monitors saw community transmission taking place in the London area as of mid-May, but it has been suggested that cases were already spreading in Europe in the previous months.

Transmission 

A large portion of those infected were believed to have not recently traveled to areas of Africa where mpox is normally found, such as Nigeria, the Democratic Republic of the Congo as well as central and western Africa. It is believed to be transmitted by close contact with sick people, with extra caution for those individuals with lesions on their skin or genitals, along with their bedding and clothing. The CDC has also stated that individuals should avoid contact and consumption of dead animals such as rats, squirrels, monkeys and apes along with wild game or lotions derived from animals in Africa.

Symptoms such as fever, headache, swollen lymph nodes, and rashes or lesions are fairly common. Additionally some patients also have presented with proctitis. The Public Health Agency of Canada has noted that person to person transmission of mpox is possible from direct contact with bodily fluids including sexual contact.

History 

On May 18, the United States confirmed its first 2022 case of mpox and Canada reported 13 suspected cases. On May 19, the first confirmed case of mpox was reported in Toronto.
On May 27, 500 people in Montreal, Quebec, received smallpox vaccinations. By July 6, 800 Montrealers had lined up at the clinic in the center of the Gay Village that was offering the initial vaccination.

Number of cases confirmed in the Canadian provinces
Canada currently has the 8th most mpox cases.

Responses 
This was the first time in history that mpox was in Canada.

See also
2022–2023 mpox outbreak
Timeline of the 2022–2023 mpox outbreak
 2022–2023 mpox outbreak in Asia
 2022–2023 mpox outbreak in Brazil
 2022–2023 mpox outbreak in India
 2022–2023 mpox outbreak in Israel
 2022–2023 mpox outbreak in Japan
 2022–2023 mpox outbreak in South Africa
 2022–2023 mpox outbreak in Europe
 2022–2023 mpox outbreak in France
 2022–2023 mpox outbreak in Germany
 2022–2023 mpox outbreak in the Netherlands
 2022–2023 mpox outbreak in Portugal
 2022–2023 mpox outbreak in Spain
 2022–2023 mpox outbreak in the United Kingdom
 2022–2023 mpox outbreak in the United States
 2022–2023 mpox outbreak in Peru
 Mpox in Nigeria
 Mpox in the Democratic Republic of the Congo

Notes

References

External links

Canada
Mpox
Mpox